Alberto Carlos Oliart Saussol (29 July 1928 – 13 February 2021) was a Spanish politician and executive. He was a government minister three times during the Spanish transition to democracy and chairman of Spanish Radio and Television Corporation between 2009 and 2011.

Early life 
Born on 29 July 1928 in Mérida, his father was Antonio Oliart Ruiz, a wealthy conservative who had fled Barcelona with the help of the socialist deputy Antonio Fernández Bolaño because of the repression that was unleashed against the rightists after the failure of the July 1936 coup in the Catalan capital. He first took refuge in Mérida, recently taken by Francisco Franco's troops. There, the commander of the Civil Guard, Manuel Gómez Cantos, was about to arrest him because he was convinced that he was a Catalan spy. Antonio Oliart managed to escape again and finally landed in Burgos, the capital of the rebellious Spain.

He earned a Licentiate degree in Law at the University of Barcelona in 1950 and, three years later, in 1953, he joined the State Lawyers Corps, serving as such until 1965, when he was appointed Chief Administrative and Finance Officer of Renfe.

Political career

Minister of Industry (1977–1978) and Deputy
Appointed Minister of Industry and Energy by Prime Minister Adolfo Suárez, Oliart was sworn in on 5 July 1977. He left the post in February 1978. Later in the year, Oliart joined the Union of the Democratic Centre (UCD) in December 1978 and ran as candidate to the Congress of Deputies, 2nd in the UCD list for the 1979 general election in the constituency of Badajoz. Elected member of the 1st Congress of Deputies, he chaired the Committee on Defense of the Lower House from May 1979 to September 1980.

Minister of Health and Social Security (1980–1981)
He was appointed Minister of Health and Social Security in the fifth Suárez's cabinet on 8 September 1980 after a reshuffling of the government and until 26 February 1981.

Minister of Defence (1981–1982)
Some days after the 23-F, on 26 February 1981, he was appointed Minister of Defence in the new cabinet presided over by Leopoldo Calvo Sotelo.

One of the first things he did when he took office was to meet with each of the captains general to find out their views on the coup, learning that the majority agreed with the proposal of the general Alfonso Armada to establish a new provisional government. During the subsequent trial of the coup plotters, he had to intervene in the process to replace the president of the military court because he was unable to maintain the order of the sessions, which were especially tense and where the defendants caused disorder. The Supreme Council of Military Justice issued a ruling on 3 June 1982 condemning the perpetrators of the coup. Faced with popular rejection of the low penalties for which they were convicted, Oliart ordered the prosecutor in the case to appeal the sentence on 10 June 1982. The Supreme Court ended up raising the years of prison sentence with a sentence dated 22 April 1983.

On 1 October 1982, the Supreme Court rejected the complaints filed by the insurgent military officers Jaime Milans del Bosch and Antonio Tejero against Oliart and Prime Minister Calvo-Sotelo, accusing the Defense Minister of attacking judicial independence for urging on behalf of the government recourse to the sentences that condemned them to prison.

Oliart was also in charge of the reform of the Superior Center of Defense Information, naming on 23 May 1981 Lieutenant Colonel  as its director with the mission of control and neutralization of any type of suspicious movement after the coup.

On the night of 1 October 1982 Manglano summoned Prime Minister Calvo Sotelo, Oliart and the Minister of the Interior Juan José Rosón to a meeting. At that meeting, which lasted several hours, Manglano unveiled a coup d'état conspiracy that several military officials were preparing that was going to be especially bloody, and that was going to be executed on 27 October 1982, the day before the general election. After the meeting, the immediate arrest of the leaders was ordered and they were able to dismantle them on 2 October 1982.

He was the architect of the entry of Spain into NATO, which materialized on 30 May 1982.
He appointed the first civilian to a high position in the ministry, appointing Eduardo Serra Rexach Under-Secretary of State for Defence on 12 February 1982.

With the victory of the PSOE in the 1982 general election, Oliart ceased office on 2 December 1982 and was succeeded by Narcís Serra the following day.

Chairman of RTVE

He was appointed as President of RTVE on 11 November 2009. Proposed as consensus candidate between the Spanish Socialist Workers' Party and the People's Party as he had to be ratified by a 2/3 qualified majority in the Congress of Deputies, the appointment was questioned on the basis of the age of the octogenarian candidate and his lack of media training. He took office on 26 November 2009 after assuming the position of member of the Board of Directors in the Congress of Deputies.

During his tenure, TVE stopped broadcasting advertising and consolidated itself as audience leader, despite criticism of manipulation of the news by PP.

He resigned on 6 July 2011 for "reasons of strict personal character and mature reflection", but after jumping to the controversy that he gave his son a public contract.

Personal life and death
Oliart married Carmen de Torres Flores, with whom he had six children. One of them, Isabel Oliart, was married to the singer-songwriter Joaquín Sabina and had two daughters.

After leaving active politics, he returned to his activity as a lawyer and started a cattle breeding business on his Los Rafaeles farm in Badajoz. Between 1995 and 2004 he was associated with the Madrid lawyer José Manuel Romero Moreno. A fan of writing, in 1997 he won the X Comillas Award for Biography, Autobiography and Memories for Against Oblivion ("Contra el olvido"), an autobiographical book, in which he recalls events that marked his life from childhood to adulthood. His second autobiographical book, entitled The years that changed everything ("Los años que lo cambiaron todo") was published in 2019.

Oliart died from COVID-19 after being admitted to a hospital in Madrid on 13 February 2021, aged 92 during the COVID-19 pandemic in Spain.

Decorations 
 Grand Cross of the Order of Charles III (1978)
 Grand Cross of the Order of Isabella the Catholic (1982)
 Grand Cross of the Order of Military Merit, with White Decoration (1985)
 Grand Cross of the Order of the Agricultural, Fishing and Food Merit (1994)
 Medal of Extremadura (1998)
 Grand Cross of the Order of Naval Merit (1999)

References 

1928 births
2021 deaths
Members of the 1st Congress of Deputies (Spain)
Health ministers of Spain
Members of the State Lawyers Corps
Defence ministers of Spain
Industry ministers of Spain
People from Mérida, Spain
Grand Crosses of Military Merit
Knights Grand Cross of the Order of Isabella the Catholic
Deaths from the COVID-19 pandemic in Spain